The women's long jump at the 1966 European Athletics Championships was held in Budapest, Hungary, at Népstadion on 2 and 3 September 1966.

Medalists

Results

Final
3 September

Qualification
2 September

Participation
According to an unofficial count, 23 athletes from 16 countries participated in the event.

 (1)
 (1)
 (1)
 (1)
 (2)
 (1)
 (1)
 (1)
 (1)
 (2)
 (1)
 (2)
 (2)
 (1)
 (2)
 (3)

References

Long jump
Long jump at the European Athletics Championships
Euro